Luo Wen-shan (born c. 1936) is a Taiwanese military officer and politician.

Early life and political career
He was born c. 1936. He attended the Republic of China Military Academy, where he later served as an administrator. He later served as administrative deputy minister of national defense under Chen Li-an, then was elected to the third convocation of the National Assembly in 1996.

Controversy
A total of NT$10 million was paid in four transactions, in 2008, 2010, and 2012, and three of the payments were traced to Xu. The prosecutors' investigation into Luo found that he deposited all of the payments into direct deposit accounts belonging to him and his wife, then moved three remittances into an account owned by Chinese Huangpu Four Seas Alliance Association. The fourth remittance was moved to the association's bank account in 2013. The Taipei District Court ruled on the case in December 2019, sentencing Luo to five concurrent terms of imprisonment, one term each for the four political donations, and the fifth for embezzlement.

References

1930s births
Living people
Republic of China Army generals
20th-century Taiwanese politicians
Government ministers of Taiwan
Taiwanese politicians convicted of fraud
Republic of China Military Academy alumni
Politicians convicted of embezzlement